Manica Architecture (stylized as MANICA) is a Kansas City, Kansas-based architecture firm. The firm owned by namesake David Manica was formed in 2007, who previously worked at sports architecture firm HOK Sport, where he was the lead designer on The O2 Arena, the new Wembley Stadium and the Beijing National Stadium.

Projects 

Manica has designed numerous sports and entertainment facilities, such as:

 Allegiant Stadium in Las Vegas, Nevada for the Las Vegas Raiders,
 DRV PNK Stadium in Fort Lauderdale, Florida for Inter Miami CF,
 Chase Center in San Francisco for the Golden State Warriors,
 The renovation of Camp Nou in Barcelona for FC Barcelona,
 Lusail Iconic Stadium in Doha, Qatar for the 2022 FIFA World Cup, in Partnership with Foster + Partners,
 VTB Arena in Moscow, Russia,
 The Hospital for Special Surgery Training Center in Industry City, Brooklyn, a training facility for the Brooklyn Nets. 

Manica has also been contracted for:
 Designing the Carson Stadium in Los Angeles for the then Oakland Raiders and San Diego Chargers (the design was later transferred with changes to the Raiders' Las Vegas stadium project) and the proposed Chargers stadium in San Diego after the Carson project failed.
 In addition, Manica Architecture was selected to help plan the new NFL stadium for the Chicago Bears at Arlington Park,
 Renovate Progressive Field for the Cleveland Guardians,
 Construction to a new stadium in Nashville for the Tennessee Titans.

References

External links

 

Architecture firms based in Missouri
Companies based in Kansas City, Missouri